Henry Slocum defeated Howard Taylor in the all comers' final, 6–4, 6–1, 6–0 to win the men's singles tennis title at the 1888 U.S. National Championships. Slocum won the Challenge Round automatically, as seven-time reigning champion Richard Sears did not defend his title. The event was held at the Newport Casino, R.I.

Draw

Challenge round

All Comers' finals

Earlier rounds

Section 1

Section 2

References

 

Men's Singles
1888